Mullan may refer to:

People
 Brian Mullan (born 1978), American soccer player
 C. H. Mullan (1912–1996), Northern Ireland judge and unionist politician 
 Charles W. Mullan (1845–1919), American judge and politician
 Ciarán Mullan (born 1984), Irish Gaelic footballer
 Don Mullan (born 1956), Irish humanitarian worker, writer and film producer
 Gerry Mullan (disambiguation), several people
 Harry Mullan (1946–1999), Irish boxing writer
 John Mullan (disambiguation), several people
 Kieran Mullan (born 1984), British MP
 Martin Mullan, Irishman convicted of IRA gun-running
 Matt Mullan (born 1987), English rugby player
 Peter Mullan (born 1959), Scottish actor
 Robert Mullan, British film director

Places

United States
 Mullan, Idaho
 Mullan Pass, Montana, a mountain pass in the Rockies
 Mullan Road, Montana and Washington

Other places
 Mullan, County Fermanagh, a townland in County Fermanagh, Northern Ireland
 Mullan, County Londonderry, a townland in County Londonderry, Northern Ireland
 Mullan, County Cavan, a townland of County Cavan, Republic of Ireland

See also
 
 Mullane, a surname
 Mullen, a surname
 Mullin, a surname